Wimborne Minster is the parish church of Wimborne, Dorset, England. The minster has existed for over 1300 years and is recognised for its unusual chained library (one of only a few surviving chained libraries in the world). The minster is a former monastery and Benedictine nunnery, and King Æthelred of Wessex is buried there.

History

Wimborne Abbey
The minster is dedicated to Saint Cuthburga (sister to Ine, King of Wessex and wife of Aldfrith, King of Northumbria) who founded a Benedictine abbey of nuns at the present day minster  705. Saint Walpurga was educated in the monastery, where she spent 26 years before travelling to Germany, following the missionary call of her mother's brother Saint Boniface. Leoba was also educated in this place. A monastery for men was also built around this time, adjacent to the abbey. Over the next hundred years the abbey and monastery grew in size and importance. 

In 871 King Æthelred I of Wessex, elder brother of Alfred the Great, was buried in the minster. Alfred was succeeded by his son Edward the Elder in 899, and Æthelred's son, Æthelwold, rebelled and attempted to claim the throne. He seized a nun, probably of Wimborne, and made a stand there, probably because of its symbolic importance as his father's burial place, but he was unable to gain enough support to fight Edward and fled to the Vikings of Northumbria.

Collegiate church
The women's monastery was destroyed by the Danes in 1013 during one of their incursions into Wessex and never rebuilt, though the main abbey building survived. In 1043 Edward the Confessor founded a college of secular (non-monastic) canons, consisting of a dean, four prebends, four vicars, four deacons, and five singers at the minster. The minster was remodelled and rebuilt by the Normans between 1120 and 1180, to support that institution.

In 1318 Edward II issued a document that made the minster a royal peculiar which exempted it from all diocesan jurisdiction. The choir used to wear scarlet robes, a legacy of this peculiar. Similar robes of this type are worn in Westminster Abbey and St George's Chapel at Windsor Castle. In 1496 Lady Margaret Beaufort, great-granddaughter of John of Gaunt and mother of Henry VII, founded a small chapel in the minster. With the reign of Henry VIII the remaining parts of the monastery were adopted into part of the minster to avoid being destroyed. However much of the wealth of the minster was confiscated by King Henry VIII.

In 1562 a grant was obtained from Queen Elizabeth I by which part of the property formerly belonging to the college, together with all ecclesiastical rights and prerogatives was returned to Wimborne and vested in twelve governors. The charter was surrendered to James I and a new charter was obtained from Charles I at a cost of £1,000 with the addition of an organist and singing men. During the Civil War, when Charles I was beheaded, his coat of arms was painted out from the wall of the minster, but on the restoration of Charles II the arms were speedily replaced and have now been restored.

In 1846 the royal peculiar was abolished, and now all that remains of the old order is the control by 12 governors of some of the minster affairs. The church was renovated towards the end of the 19th century and its last addition, a vestry was added at the same time. Today the church is a place of visit and worship for the local community and visitors.

Deans of Wimborne

Martin de Pateshull 1223
Randolf Brito 1229
John Mansell 1247
John Kirby 1265
John de Berwick 1286
Stephen de Malo Lacu or Mauley 1312
Richard de Clare 1317
Richard de Swynnerton 1335
Richard de Murymouth 1338
Robert de Kyngeston 1342
Thomas de Clopton 1349
Reginald Brian 1349 
Thomas de Brembre 1350 
Henry de Bukyngham 1361
Richard de Beverley 1367
John Carp 1387 
Roger Coryngham 1400
Peter de Altobasso or Altobosco 1412
Walter Medford  1415
Gilbert Kymer 1423
Walter Hurte  1467
Hugh Oldham 1485
Thomas Ruthall  1508
Henry Hornby  1509
Reginald Pole 1518 
Nicholas Wilson 1537

Architecture
The central tower and nave were founded in Saxon times, but the surviving building is predominantly Norman in design and construction, with Gothic components from various periods. One of its more famous architectural features include a working astronomical clock, which rings every hour and is represented in the form of a colourful quarterjack. The minster is built in a combination of Dorset limestone and New Forest stone.

The 13th-century spire which once topped this tower fell down in a storm around 1600.

It is a Grade I listed building.

The chained library

Until it was confiscated during Henry VIII's reign, the old Treasury held the wealth of the minster and numerous artefacts such as (reputed to be) a piece of the true cross, wood from The Manger and cloth from The Shroud. Since 1686 it has housed an important chained library. The chained library was one of the first public libraries in the UK, and it remains the second-largest.  Some of the collections of the library include a manuscript written on lambskin in 1343, a book bound for the Court of Henry VIII, an incunabulum printed in 1495 on the works of Saint Anselm, and a Paraphrase of Erasmus printed in 1522 with a title page designed by Holbein.

The library is run by volunteers and remains open to the public on week days 10.30-12.30 & 2-4 (closed in  winter season).

The bells 
Since 1911 the west tower at the minster has been home to a ring of ten bells.  The original tenor bell was housed in the central tower and was cast in 1385.  The central tower was considered too structurally weak to add much more additional weight, so in 1464 the west tower was constructed in order to house five bells.  In 1629 the tenor bell was recast.  Besides the tenor, the minster at this time was home to the 'Bell of St. Cuthburga', 'The Fyfer Bell', 'The Jesus Bell' and 'The Morrow Mass Bell'; presumably all housed in the west tower. In 2012, the bells were augmented to 12 by Whitechapel Bell Foundry, with an additional semitone bell cast to make a total of 13 bells.

The organ

The organ was originally built in 1664 by Robert Hayward, of Bath. There are a number of ranks of pipes, still functioning in the present instrument, which date from this time. Originally, the organ stood upon a screen which separated the nave from the choir. However, in 1856 the organist at that time (Mr. F. Blount) removed the instrument and resited it in the south choir aisle. J. W. Walker & Sons rebuilt and enlarged the organ in 1866 and carried out further work in 1899, when a new case to house the Choir Organ was provided. This was designed by Walter J. Fletcher. In 1965, a major rebuilding and re-designing of the instrument took place, the work again being undertaken by J. W. Walker & Sons. The organ started being rebuilt by Mander Organ Builders in 2021 with a possible completion date of early 2022. The project will see the instrument reorganised, with two new cases, a revised winding system and a new 32' pedal Sub Bass.

The organists

1537 John Clifford
1590 Robert Durman
1596 Arthur Maynard
1600 Thomas Noble
1610 William Eames
1622 Thomas Noble
1627 Thomas Cottrell
1664 John Silver
1695 George Day
1713 John Fyler
1743 George Combes
1765 Richard Combes
1798 William Mitchell
1808 John Wright Blount
1835 Frederick Stanley Blount
1863 J. Whitehead Smith
1897 J. E. Tidnam
1902 Albert Edward Wilshire
1915 G.E.C. Eyers
1945 Norman Charlton-Burdon
1954 Graham Sudbury
1959 David S. Blott
1967 Michael Austin
1971 Barry Ferguson
1977 Christopher Dowie
2005 David Gostick (Director of Music)
2019 Colin Davey

Assistant organists

1943 Ronald Gomer
1965 John Slater
Graham Davies
1974 Michael James
1981 Roger Overend and Michael Pain
1982 Simon Morley
1986 Alex Ditchmont
1987 Jonathan Melling
1988 Sean Tucker
Ed Dowie
1997-2018 Sean Tucker (organist)

The clock

Wimborne Minster is the home of Wimborne Minster Astronomical Clock, one of a group of famous 14th to 16th century astronomical clocks to be found in the west of England. (See also
Salisbury,
Wells,
Exeter, and
Ottery St Mary.)

The clock's case was built in the Elizabethan era, but the face and dial are of a much greater age; the first documents relating to the clock concern repairs carried out in 1409. The face utilizes a pre-Copernican display, with a centrally placed earth orbited by the sun and stars.

It is currently maintained by Wimborne resident Bruce Jensen.

Tombs
The most important tomb in the church is that of King Ethelred, the brother of Alfred the Great. Ethelred was mortally wounded in a battle at Martin, near Cranborne. The exact location of the tomb however is unknown, though sources and legend indicate that it resides somewhere near the altar. A 14th-century metal brass memorial next to the altar states that the former king is buried in the wall and is the only brass to mark the burial site of an English monarch. Two other important tombs are also in the minster: they are those of John Beaufort, 1st Duke of Somerset, and his duchess, the maternal grandparents of King Henry VII of England, constructed out of alabaster and Purbeck Marble.

Other burials
Cuthburh
Gertrude Courtenay, Marchioness of Exeter
Montague Druitt

Gallery

References

 Patricia H. Coulstock, The Collegiate Church of Wimborne Minster - Studies in the History of Medieval Religion, (Boydell Press)
 
 Wimborne Minster Official Guidebook, Wimborne Minster and Jarrold Press (2002)
 Charles Herbert Mayo, A history of Wimborne Minster: the collegiate church of Saint Cuthburga and King's free chapel at Wimborne, (Wimborne: Bell & Daldry, 1860)

External links

 
 Excellent Information on the Minster including Sources for further study
 Catholic Encyclopedia Article on the Minster
 Bell's Cathedrals: Wimbourne Minster and Christchurch Priory — from Project Gutenberg
 Information about the bells at the Minster

Church of England church buildings in Dorset
Anglo-Saxon monastic houses
Benedictine monasteries in England
Monasteries in Dorset
Wimborne Minster
Grade I listed churches in Dorset
8th-century establishments in England
Burial sites of Anglo-Saxon royal houses
Former Royal Peculiars
Churches completed in 705
8th-century church buildings in England